"Roc the Mic" is the first single to be released from the soundtrack of the 2002 crime film State Property and was performed by Beanie Sigel and Freeway. The single was so far the highest-charting single from both rappers making it to #55 on the US Billboard Hot 100. The remix to "Roc the Mic" features St. Louis rappers Nelly and Murphy Lee of the St. Lunatics and was included on rapper Nelly's 2002 album, Nellyville as a radio-only single. The single also appears on The Source Presents: Hip Hop Hits, Vol. 6 and The Roc Files, Vol. 1.

Track listing
A-side
A1 "Roc the Mic (Radio edit)"
A2 "Roc the Mic (LP version)"

B-side
B1 "Roc the Mic (Instrumental)"
B2 "Roc the Mic (A Capella)"

Charts

Weekly charts

Year-end charts

References

2002 singles
Beanie Sigel songs
Freeway (rapper) songs
Song recordings produced by Just Blaze
Roc-A-Fella Records singles
Songs written by Beanie Sigel
2001 songs
Songs written by Just Blaze
Gangsta rap songs